Viktor Karamarkov (born 1981), known as The Macedonian Raskolnikov, is a Macedonian serial killer who murdered four elderly women in the nation's capital from March to October 2009. Additionally responsible for numerous thefts and three attempted murders, he was sentenced to life imprisonment, and is currently incarcerated in Kolonija Idrizovo.

Early life
Born in the Gjorče Petrov neighborhood, Karamarkov grew up with his mentally unstable mother, as his father had died when he was young. Although described as a loner, Karamarkov was regarded as a highly intelligent boy who finished his primary education with an excellent grade, and was very respectful of the elderly. He was also heavily indulged in various Russian literature, especially Fyodor Dostoevsky's Crime and Punishment, identifying himself with the novel's main character, impoverished ex-student Rodion Raskolnikov. However, Karamarkov was also a known delinquent and drug addict, who frequently engaged in various thefts.

Murders
Taking inspiration from his favorite book, Karamarkov would search for vulnerable, older ladies to commit his murders. When he found a suitable victim, he would ring the doorbell and ask them for money, on the pretense that it was for his ailing mother. After entering the apartment, Karamarkov would take out a small axe wrapped in a newspaper and tape and kill the unsuspecting victim.  After killing the victim he would steal any gold jewelry found in the apartment in order to supply his drug habit. After each killing, he would visit the "St. Peter and Paul" Church in Gjorče Petrov, and ask for forgiveness.

Victims
 Ljubica Hristovska (83) - Killed at her home in Butel, from a sustained head injury. When first investigated, police suspected that the killer was either from the family or the neighborhood due to the fact there were no signs of a struggle, nothing appeared to have disturbed and the door had been locked from the inside.
 Bosilka Krasojevič (71) - Killed on  October 15. She was attacked in her home on "October Revolution" Street, and later died from her injuries. Authorities noted that this killing was very similar to Hristovska's murder.
 Vera Bogoevska (76) - Killed on the same day as Krasojevič. She was attacked in her home on "Franco Cluz" Street, and later died from her injuries.
 Elena Mileva (69) - Killed on October 26, in her home on "Ho Chi Minh" Street. Karamarkov was arrested for theft shortly after her murder.

Attempted murders
 Marija Atanasovska (79) - A resident of Kapishtec, Atanasovska was assaulted by Karamarkov in an elevator, sustaining head injuries. While Atanasovska laid bleeding to death, he attempted to leave the scene but was surprised by the victim's son-in-law, who was waiting for her at the exit. The son-in-law, confused after seeing blood in the elevator, asked Karamarkov as he was exiting what happened to the victim. Karamarkov explained that she had injured herself, and helped the son-in-law get her out of the elevator, before promptly fleeing the scene.
 Smilja Petrovska (73) - Attacked on October 21. She was able to fight off her attacker near her "Railway Street" home.
 Sanie Sulejmani (42) - Sulejmani, a hygienist,  was attacked on the same day as Petrovska.  Sulejmani managed to fight off Karamarkov at her home on  Mavrovka Shopping Centre.

Investigation, capture and sentence
Although initially they didn't suspect there was a serial killer on the prowl, authorities gradually connected the dots due to the crimes similarities: elderly women, killed in their apartments with a blunt object to the back of the head. It was also noticed that all the victims had gold jewelry missing. They contacted the surviving victims statements, who described their attacker as a young man, who went door to door with a health book in his hands, seeking financial help for his mother. However, they couldn't describe him in great detail, as he appeared average and very unassuming. On October 27, Karamarkov was captured and given an 8-month sentence for theft, but witnesses and relatives of the attacked women identified him as the attacker. While searching his home, authorities located the axe used in the murders.

Shortly after his picture was shown on national television, many women came to identify him as the man who had stolen their jewelry. One woman, identified only as K. M., said that ten days before his arrest, he forcibly pulled off her gold chain while she walking near the Ministry of Culture. Distressed, the young woman chased after the perpetrator, but he managed to slip away. Shocked, Karamarkov's mother refused to believe that her son was a cold-blooded killer.

Although he didn't confess to the killings, Karamarkov mentioned details that only the perpetrator would know. During his final statement to the court, Karamarkov claimed that he had been drugged while making his statements, and that he had been taken for three days at an unknown location. While there, a picture of Josip Broz Tito was hung on the wall, and he had not been provided a lawyer. Despite this, he was sentenced to life imprisonment, much to the dismay of his lawyer Sasho Dukovski, who claimed that there was no sufficient evidence for the verdict.

See also
List of serial killers by country

References

1981 births
2009 murders in Europe
21st-century criminals
Living people
Macedonian people convicted of murder
Macedonian prisoners sentenced to life imprisonment
Macedonian serial killers
Male serial killers
People convicted of attempted murder
People convicted of murder by North Macedonia
People from Skopje
Prisoners sentenced to life imprisonment by North Macedonia